St. Patriarch Evtimiy is a Sofia Metro station on M3 line. It was opened on 26 August 2020 as part of the inaugural section of the line, from Hadzhi Dimitar to Krasno Selo. The station is located between Orlov Most and NDK II.

Location 
The station is located under the Patriarch Evtimiy Square.

References

Sofia Metro stations
2020 establishments in Bulgaria
Railway stations opened in 2020